Marisol Carratú Santoro (born 15 July 1986) is an Argentine handball goalkeeper for CB Atlético Guardés and the Argentina women's national handball team.

She defended Argentina at the 2013 World Women's Handball Championship in Serbia and at the 2015 World Women's Handball Championship in Denmark.

Achievements
Argentinean Clubs Championship: 2015

References

External links

Argentine female handball players
1986 births
Living people
Pan American Games medalists in handball
Pan American Games silver medalists for Argentina
Handball players at the 2015 Pan American Games
Handball players at the 2019 Pan American Games
Handball players at the 2016 Summer Olympics
Olympic handball players of Argentina
Expatriate handball players
Argentine expatriate sportspeople in Spain
Argentine expatriate sportspeople in France
Sportspeople from Buenos Aires
South American Games silver medalists for Argentina
South American Games medalists in handball
Competitors at the 2018 South American Games
Medalists at the 2019 Pan American Games
Medalists at the 2015 Pan American Games
21st-century Argentine women